Alan Edward Bell is an American film editor.  He has edited such films as Little Manhattan, 500 Days of Summer, The Amazing Spider-Man, The Hunger Games: Catching Fire, The Hunger Games: Mockingjay – Part 1, The Hunger Games: Mockingjay – Part 2, and Red Sparrow.

Career 
Bell's mentor when he started working in Hollywood was editor Robert Leighton. Bell served as associate editor on multiple Rob Reiner films, all under Leighton, such as Misery, A Few Good Men, North, and The American President.  Bell then graduated to main editor with films such as Reiner's The Story of Us and Alex & Emma, and then started a steady stream of work in the mid-2000s, with films including Little Manhattan, Hoot, The Comebacks, 500 Days of Summer, Gulliver's Travels, and Water for Elephants.  Bell then reunited with 500 Days of Summer director Marc Webb for The Amazing Spider-Man.  Bell next edited The Hunger Games: Catching Fire for Water for Elephants director Francis Lawrence, and then edited the remainder of the films in The Hunger Games film series, as well as Lawrence's Red Sparrow. In 2022, he worked on the film adaptation of Delia Owens' novel Where the Crawdads Sing, directed by Olivia Newman.

Bell is a member of American Cinema Editors (ACE) and the Academy of Motion Picture Arts and Sciences (AMPAS).

Filmography

References

External links 
 Alan Edward Bell at IMDb

American Cinema Editors
American film editors
Living people

Year of birth missing (living people)